The ACEA agreement refers to a voluntary agreement between the European Automobile Manufacturers Association (ACEA) and the European Commission to limit the amount of carbon dioxide (CO2) emitted by passenger cars sold in Europe.

Signed in 1998, the agreement sought to achieve an average of 140 g/km of CO2 by 2008 for new passenger vehicles sold by the association's cars in Europe. This target represents a 25% reduction from the 1995 level of 186 g/km and is equivalent to a fuel economy of 5.8 L/100 km or 5.25 L/100 km for petrol and diesel engines respectively. However, the average for the whole car market for 2008 was 153.7 g/km, so the target has not been achieved.

Besides the agreement with ACEA, the European Commission also closed agreements with the Japan Automobile Manufacturers Association (JAMA) and Korea Automobile Manufacturers Association (KAMA). However, for the latter two the target date is 2009 instead of 2008 and as ACEA accounts for 86.4% of car sales in Europe, the impact of the latter two is much smaller.

The ultimate EU target to which these agreements are to contribute, is to reach an average CO2 emission (as measured according to Commission Directive 93/116/EC) of 130 g/km for all new passenger cars by 2015.

The European Commission announced in late 2006 that it is working on a proposal for legally binding measures and limits.

In February 2007, the commission acknowledged the failure of the voluntary agreement. Following this, a proposal of regulation was introduced by the commission on 19 December 2007.

Implementation
The agreement defines fleet-average CO2 emission targets from new cars sold in the European Union, to be reached collectively by the members of the association. CO2 is the only gas covered by the agreements, other greenhouse gas emissions are currently not controlled (see carbon dioxide equivalent). How the target is to be achieved is not specified, and are expected by the commission to be mainly by technological developments and market changes linked to these developments.

Apart from the 140 g/km target, the ACEA should evaluate in 2003 the potential for additional improvements with a view to moving further towards the objective of emission targets:

 In the range of 165-170 g/km CO2 in 2003.
 140 g/km of CO2 by 2008.
 130 g/km of CO2 by 2015.

Concerning costs, a report for the European Commission last year showed that the cost of meeting the target for new cars of 120 g/km of CO2 would be on average €577 per car, which could be earned back in a few years time due to the improved fuel economy implied in the reductions.

Progress towards the target

2005 report
Fiat has already reached the 2008 goal, three years in advance (achieving 139 g/km). Citroen (144 g/km) and Renault (149 g/km) are on track to meet the 140 g/km commitment in 2008. Ford (151 g/km) and Peugeot (151 g/km) are almost on track. These brands were also relatively good performers in 1997 and yet still managed to reduce their CO2 emissions significantly.

2007 report
Only Fiat was able to reach the 2008 planned goal of 140 g/km, with a value of 137.3 g/km. Peugeot (141.9 g/km) and Citroen (142.2 g/km) are still on track.

2008 report
Only two brands were able to reach the 2008 planned goal of 140 g/km: Fiat, with a value of 133.7 g/km and Peugeot, with 138.1 g/km. The Fiat Auto Group (including the Fiat, Alfa Romeo, Lancia, Abarth, Ferrari and Maserati brands) was the only group to reach the planned value, averaging 138.4 g/km. The average for the whole car market for 2008 is 153.7 g/km, so the target has not been achieved.

2009 report
More brands reached the (now expired) 2008 140 g/km goal: Fiat (127.8 g/km), Toyota (130.1 g/km), Peugeot (133.6 g/km), Renault (137.5 g/km), Citroen (137.9 g/km) and Ford (140.0 g/km). Fiat, however, was the only brand to reach the 2015 goal of 130 g/km, 6 years in advance. The Fiat Auto Group (including the Fiat, Alfa Romeo, Lancia, Abarth, Ferrari and Maserati brands) averaged to 131.0 g/km.

2010 report
For the fourth year running, Fiat Automobiles is the brand that has recorded the lowest level of  emissions by vehicles sold in Europe in 2010 as certified by the company JATO Dynamics. Fiat posted a mean value of 123.1 g/km and it also ranked first as Group, with 125.9 g/km and an improvement of 5 g/km compared to last year.

2011 report
For the fifth year running, Fiat Automobiles is the brand that has recorded the lowest level of  emissions by vehicles sold in Europe in 2011 as certified by the company JATO Dynamics. Fiat posted a mean value of 118.2 g/km, the first and only brand to reach the 120 g/km value, while other seven brands were able to reach the 130 g/km value. The average for the whole car market is 136.1 g/km.

2012 report 
For the sixth year running, Fiat Automobiles is the brand that has recorded the lowest level of  emissions by vehicles sold in Europe in 2012 as certified by the company JATO Dynamics. Fiat posted a mean value of 119.8 g/km, still the only brand to reach the 120 g/km value, while other eight brands were able to reach the 130 g/km value. The average for the whole car market is 132.3 g/km.

Longer-term target
The commission will support research efforts towards reaching the European Road Transport Research Advisory Council (ERTRAC) research target of "Improvements in vehicle efficiency [that] will deliver as much as a 40% reduction in CO2 emissions for passenger cars for the new vehicle fleet in 2020". This would correspond to a new car fleet average of 95 g/km of CO2 (COM/2007/19).

Some environmental groups insist on the need for a longer-term target that doubles fuel efficiency of new cars over the next decade, 80 g/km of CO2 by 2020.

See also

Biofuels directive
Car taxation
Conventional (Internal Combustion) Car Engine
Emission standard
European Common Transport Policy
Energy policy of the European Union
European exhaust emission standards
Fuel efficiency
Hybrid vehicle
Oil dependence
Proactive and reactive
Vehicle efficiency.

References

External links

 European Commission page on agreements with automotive industry
  Commission's website with annual monitoring and progress reports of the agreements.
 Lack of Disclosure from European Automakers Threatens Investors (April 2005), World Resources Institute (WRI)
 The official ACEA – Commission Agreement itself: Commission Recommendation of 5 February 1999 on the reduction of CO2 emissions from passenger cars (notified under document number C(1999) 107), (1999/125/EC)
 How Clean is Your Car Brand? The car industry's commitment to the EU to reduce CO2 emissions: a brand-by-brand progress report. European Federation for Transport and Environment, October 2006
   EU to introduce legislation as car makers fail on emission targets AFP, 3 November 2006
 Dieselnet.com overview of the ACEA agreement from the pages of dieselnet.com

In the media
7 Feb 2007, BBC: EU car CO2 fight only beginning
7 Feb 2007, European Commission: EU plans legislation to cut CO2 emissions from cars
6 Feb 2007, International Herald Tribune: EU to compromise on auto emissions
31 Jan 2007, Transport & Environment: Europe set to clean up fuels but stalls on cars
31 Jan 2007, European Commission: EU proposes stricter fuel standards to cut CO2 emissions
24 Jan 2007, The Guardian: Grand plan for a low-carbon Europe goes up in smoke
19 Oct 2004: European Environment Agency: Poor European test standards understate air pollution from cars

Climate change policy
Climate change in the European Union
Transport and the European Union